Herwig Wolfram (born 14 February 1934) is an Austrian historian who is Professor Emeritus of Medieval History and Auxiliary Sciences of History at the University of Vienna and the former Director of the . He is a leading member of the Vienna School of History, and internationally known for his authoritative works on the history of Austria, the Goths, and relationships between the Germanic peoples and the Roman Empire.

Biography
Herwig Wolfram was born in Vienna, Austria on 14 February 1934. He studied history and Latin at the University of Vienna since 1952, gaining a Ph.D. there in 1957. Wolfram gained his habilitation at the Faculty of Philosophy at the University of Vienna in 1966.

Wolfram was Visiting Professor at the University of California, Los Angeles from 1968 to 1969, and has subsequently made many visits to the United States. Since 1969, Wolfram was Professor of Medieval History and Auxiliary Sciences of History at the University of Vienna. From 1983 to 2002, Wolfram was also Director of the Institute of Austrian Historical Research. He was since retired from the University of Vienna as professor emeritus.

Research
Wolfram is a leading figure in the Vienna School of History. His book History of the Goths (1979) has been translated into a number of languages and been published in several completely revised editions. It is considered the standard work on the Goths, and a work of large importance to the study of Germanic peoples in general. In the more recent editions of this work, Wolfram has adopted some of the controversial theories of Walter Goffart. Wolfram and Heather's books on the Goths are considered the foremost studies on the subject.

Honours and awards
 Member of the Austrian Academy of Sciences
 Corresponding member of Monumenta Historica
 Corresponding member of the Medieval Academy of America
 Austrian Medal for Science and Art (2000)
 Cardinal Innitzer Prize (2011)
 Corresponding member of the Slovenian Academy of Sciences and Arts (2015)

Select bibliography
Works in English translation. For a complete list see the German National Library 

History of the Goths, University of California Press, 1990.  
The Roman Empire and Its Germanic Peoples, University of California Press, 1997.  
Conrad II, 990-1039: Emperor of Three Kingdoms, Pennsylvania State University Press, 2006.

References

Sources

Online

External links
Profile at the University of Vienna website (in German) 
Biographical notes (in German) 
Biographical notes (in German) 

1934 births
20th-century Austrian historians
Corresponding Fellows of the Medieval Academy of America
Germanic studies scholars
Living people
Members of the Austrian Academy of Sciences
Members of the Slovenian Academy of Sciences and Arts
Recipients of the Austrian Decoration for Science and Art